Central Provost of Islamic Republic of Iran Army (Dežbān Markaz), acronymed DEJAJA, is the provost and military police with an authority within all military branches of Islamic Republic of Iran Army (Artesh). The provost is a subdivision to the military's Joint Staff and has seniority over designated provosts —like the "Sea Police" of Navy and the "Air Police" in the Air Force.

The provost is also responsible for performing ceremonial duties; it has honor guard units, including the "Presidential Ceremony Guard", which maneuvers during official trips of the President of Iran and during visits by heads of state.

Gallery

See also 
 General Provost of Army of the Guardians of the Islamic Revolution

References

Military police of Iran
Military provosts
Islamic Republic of Iran Army
Guards of honour